Belokataysky District (Balaqatay rayonı) is an administrative and municipal district (raion), one of the fifty-four in the Republic of Bashkortostan, Russia. It is located in the northeast of the republic and borders with Sverdlovsk Oblast in the north, Chelyabinsk Oblast in the east, Kiginsky District in the south, and with Mechetlinsky District in the west. Its administrative center is the rural locality (a selo) of Novobelokatay. As of the 2010 Census, the total population of the district was 20,169, with the population of Novobelokatay accounting for 29.6% of that number.

History
The district was established on August 20, 1930.

Administrative and municipal status
Within the framework of administrative divisions, Belokataysky District is one of the fifty-four in the Republic of Bashkortostan. The district is divided into thirteen selsoviets, comprising forty-six rural localities. As a municipal division, the district is incorporated as Belokataysky Municipal District. Its thirteen selsoviets are incorporated as thirteen rural settlements within the municipal district. The selo of Novobelokatay serves as the administrative center of both the administrative and municipal district.

References

Notes

Sources

Districts of Bashkortostan
States and territories established in 1930